A Mexican hat is a sombrero – a broad-brimmed and high-crowned hat.

Mexican hat may also refer to:

 Mexican Hat, Utah, a census-designated place in Utah, USA and/or the balanced rock nearby that resembles an inverted sombrero
 Ratibida columnifera or upright prairie coneflower, a species of wildflower that is native to much of North America
 Kalanchoe daigremontiana or Mexican hat plant, a succulent plant native to Madagascar

See also
 The Jarabe tapatío, the "Mexican Hat Dance"
 The Mexican hat potential, a prescription for the potential energy that leads to the Higgs mechanism
 The Mexican hat wavelet, a continuous wavelet function
Sombrero (disambiguation)